Mark Rothko Art Centre ( – DMRAC) is a multi-functional institution of culture, arts and education, located inside the arsenal building of the Daugavpils fortress in Daugavpils, Latvia. It is a unique place in Eastern Europe, where the original paintings of Mark Rothko are located. He was one of the greatest artists of the 20th century classified by others, but not by himself, as a member of the abstract expressionism movement, specifically color-field painting, for his famous serene few color rectangle large paintings.

The DMRAC features: Rothko Room with original works exposed; Collection of museum quality reproductions; Silent Room; digital exposition on the artist's biography and creative activities; Project Gallery exposition, collection of contemporary arts; exhibitions of the Great Children of Daugavpils (former Dvinsk, Dünaburg).
 
DMRAC facilities: the residences for artists, video hall, archive/library, conference/seminar facilities, meeting rooms, restaurant.
 
Project development of the Daugavpils Mark Rothko Art Centre:

2002: the birth of idea of the Daugavpils Mark Rothko Art Centre's foundation;
2013, April 24: opening of the Daugavpils Mark Rothko Art Centre;
2013, September 25: Mark's Rothko 110th anniversary celebrations.

Mark Rothko paintings
Six artworks loaned by Kate Rothko Prizel and Christopher Rothko are on display at the Daugavpils Mark Rothko Arts Centre:

 Mother and Child, 1934
 Sacrifice of Iphigenia, 1942
 The High Priest, 1945
 Untitled, 1948
 Nr 7 (orange and chocolate), 1957
 No. 10 (brown, black, sienna on dark wine), 1963

References

External links
 Daugavpils Mark Rothko Art Centre

2013 establishments in Latvia
Art museums established in 2013
Art museums and galleries in Latvia
Biographical museums in Latvia
Rothko, Mark
Art Centre
Daugavpils